Ferris v. Frohman, 223 U.S. 424 (1912), was a United States Supreme Court case in which the Court held an unauthorized public production of an unpublished play does not invalidate the play owner's common law copyright.

References

External links
 

1912 in United States case law
United States copyright case law
United States Supreme Court cases
United States Supreme Court cases of the White Court